Ashley Furniture Industries, Inc. is an American home furnishings manufacturer and retailer, headquartered in Arcadia, Wisconsin. The company is owned by father and son team Ron and Todd Wanek. Ashley Furniture manufactures and distributes home furniture products throughout the world.

Ashley Furniture Industries sells home furnishings and accessories available through two distribution channels: independent furniture dealers and more than 700 Ashley Furniture HomeStore retail furniture stores, which are independently owned and operated by licensees in the United States, Canada, Mexico, Chile, Central America, and Japan. It has manufacturing and distribution facilities in Wisconsin, Mississippi, California (only manufacturing closed in 2016 distribution facility remains), Indiana, Pennsylvania, North Carolina, Florida, China, and Vietnam.

History
Carlyle Weinberger founded Ashley Furniture in Chicago in 1945 as a sales operation. Specializing in wooden occasional furniture, Ashley marketed goods made by local companies. Later the company opened a branch in Goshen, Indiana. In 1970, Ashley invested in the Wisconsin-based Arcadia Furniture, founded by Thomas Brosseau. Even though Arcadia started out as a small production plant for Ashley's lines in 1976, a group of investors bought out Weinberger, taking control of Ashley Furniture. At first the two companies maintained their separate identities, with Arcadia focusing on production and Ashley on sales.

By 1982, the merged company's annual sales reached $12 million and it had moved its corporate headquarters from Chicago to Arcadia. By the mid-1980s, Ashley offered a line of roughly 350 different furniture products, and had turned its design and manufacturing away from "heirloom pieces" toward products aimed at middle-income buyers. The company's growing network included wholesalers such as Levitz Furniture and mass-retailers such as Sears, Kmart, and Montgomery Ward, in addition to smaller retailers. Sales had climbed to more than $44 million by 1985.

In 1994 Ashley acquired upholstery manufacturer Sklar-Peppler, and by the late 1990s the company was operating assembly and distribution plants in Seattle, Washington; Pomona, California; New Brunswick, New Jersey; and Orlando, Florida. Gambling that motion furniture was a strong growth area, Ashley acquired Gentry Furniture, of Ripley, Mississippi in 1999. That same year the company also branched out into retailing, licensing Ashley Furniture HomeStores to independent dealers. The chain grew in its first year to approximately 40 stores.

By 2000, Ashley Furniture Industries employed more people in Arcadia than the town's population. In 2015, the US Occupational Safety and Health Administration imposed $1.7 million in fines on Ashley due to unsafe working conditions at its Arcadia plant which caused over one thousand injuries to workers.

Today the company maintains plants across the United States and also operates several factories (including its largest) in Pacific Rim countries such as Vietnam and China. They also have sourcing offices in India, Vietnam, Southern China, Muar, and Taiwan. Ron Wanek is currently chairman of the board and Todd Wanek is currently President and CEO.

Retail presence
The Ashley HomeStore chain of furniture stores is composed of corporate owned stores and independently owned stores with licenses to sell Ashley Furniture products exclusively, including mattresses and accessories. There are over 1000 Ashley Furniture HomeStore retail furniture stores operating worldwide in more than 123 countries.
 Ashley Furniture HomeStore is a retail brand which sells home furniture and accessories. Ashley Furniture HomeStore CEO is Todd Wanek, who replaced CEO Mark Dufresne in 2017.

Philanthrophy

Ron Wanek designed and built Memorial Park in Arcadia, Wisconsin, with donations from Ashley Furniture. The park is dedicated to the soldiers who have served in wars throughout the history of the United States. The walkway in the park serves as a time line, beginning at the founding of the United States and proceeding into the future. A monument is located for each war at its place in time.

In June 2021, Ashley HomeStore gave $3,000 gift cards to twelve families that lost their homes due to Hurricane Laura. The deprived families were picked by the Trinity Baptist Church.

References

External links

 

Retail companies based in Wisconsin
Manufacturing companies based in Wisconsin
American companies established in 1945
Manufacturing companies established in 1945
Furniture companies of the United States
Privately held companies based in Wisconsin
Retail companies established in 1945
1945 establishments in Illinois
Family-owned companies of the United States